Josef Keil (13 October 1878 – 13 December 1963) was an Austrian historian, epigrapher and an archaeologist.

Keil was born on 13 October 1878 in Reichenberg, northern Bohemia (now Czech Republic). He studied classical literature, epigraphy and archaeology at the University of Vienna, and received his doctorate there. He began his career in 1904 as a scientific secretary at the Austrian archaeological institute in Smyrna (now İzmir, Turkey). He excavated archaeological sites in Asia Minor, particularly in Lydia. He led the excavations in Ephesus. He was a professor of ancient history at the University of Greifswald from 1927 to 1936, and at the University of Vienna from 1936 to 1951. From 1945 until 1949, he was the Secretary General of the Austrian Academy of Sciences. From 1949 to 1956, he was the director of the Austrian Archaeological Institute with Otto Walter and Fritz Eichler.

He died in Vienna on 13 December 1963.

Works 
Numerous publications of inscriptions from Ephesus especially in Jahresheften des Österreichischen Archäologischen Instituts.
 Ephesos. Ein Führer durch die Ruinenstätte und ihre Geschichte, Vienna, 1915
 Drei Berichte über Reisen in Lydien und weiteren Gebieten, Three reports over journeys in Lydia and other areas (with Anton von Premerstein), Vienna, 1908, 1911, 1914

Decorations and awards
 1959: Austrian Decoration for Science and Art
 1962: City of Vienna Prize for Humanities

References 
 G. Wlach, 100 Jahre Österreichisches Archäologisches Institut 1898–1998, Vienna 1998, p. 111.

1878 births
1963 deaths
Writers from Liberec
Austrian archaeologists
20th-century Austrian historians
Epigraphers
Academic staff of the University of Greifswald
Austrian expatriates in Germany
German Bohemian people
Recipients of the Austrian Decoration for Science and Art
Members of the German Academy of Sciences at Berlin
Corresponding Fellows of the British Academy
Expatriates from the Austro-Hungarian Empire in the Ottoman Empire
Travelers in Asia Minor